Gary Sheide is a former American football quarterback for Brigham Young University. He was the first quarterback to come out of LaVell Edwards's BYU "quarterback factory."

Sheide was born on November 6th, 1952 and grew up in Antioch, California. Sheide played football, baseball, and basketball for Antioch High School, graduating in 1971. He quarterbacked Diablo Valley College from 1971 to 1972. After leaving Diablo Valley, LaVell Edwards recruited Sheide to become the quarterback for Brigham Young's football team. In 1974, he led the Cougars to the Western Athletic Conference championship, LaVell Edwards' first title. Also that year he was awarded the Sammy Baugh Trophy, given to the year's best passer. He is one of seven Cougars to win the award, more than any other school. Sheide was selected in the 3rd round (64th overall pick) of the 1975 NFL Draft by the Cincinnati Bengals but he never played in the National Football League.

As of 2011, Sheide now is a physical education instructor at Mountain Ridge Jr High, in Highland, Utah. He also coaches football at nearby Lone Peak High School. As of 2008 Sheide broadcasts baseball games for BYUtv Sports with Dave McCann and Jarom Jordan, softball games with Robbie Bullough and has previously done college football games for KBYU as an analyst. On August 31, 2011, it was revealed that Sheide will be a part of the pre-game and post-game analysis for college football games on BYUtv Sports.

Sheide was recently inducted into the BYU hall of fame.

College statistics
1973: 177/294 for 2,350 yards with 22 TD vs 12 INT
1974: 181/300 for 2,174 yards with 23 TD vs 19 INT

References

Further reading
.
BYU Football Athlete Profile - Gary Sheide
Benson, Lee (2010). "Gary Sheide slighted by BYU reunion", Deseret News, 12 September 2010.

1952 births
Living people
American football quarterbacks
BYU Cougars football announcers
BYU Cougars football players
College baseball announcers in the United States
People from Antioch, California
Players of American football from California
Sportspeople from the San Francisco Bay Area
BYU Cougars baseball announcers
Brigham Young University alumni
American Latter Day Saints